W. G. Grace played in 32 matches in the 1871 English cricket season, 25 of which are recognised as first-class. His main roles in 1871 were as captain of Gloucestershire County Cricket Club and as both match organiser and captain of the United South of England Eleven (USEE). In addition, he represented Marylebone Cricket Club (MCC), the Gentlemen in the Gentlemen v Players fixture and the South in the North v South series.
 
1871 was a cold, wet summer but nevertheless one of Grace's best seasons as a batsman, for he scored 2,739 runs including 10 centuries in first-class matches at an average of 78.25, the first time anyone had scored over 2,000 runs in an English season. It was arguably his most successful season and was described by a leading cricket historian as his annus mirabilis.

Background
Having begun his top-class career in 1864 at the age of 15, Grace had by the 1871 season established himself as the sport's outstanding player. He was unmarried and still living with his parents and his younger brother, Fred Grace at the family home in Downend, near Bristol. Grace turned 23 in July 1871 and was a medical student at Bristol Medical School, having enrolled there in October 1868. Derek Birley records that it was at this time, "scorning the puny modern fashion of moustaches", that Grace grew the enormous black beard that made him so recognisable. In addition, his "ample girth" had developed, for he weighed 15 stone (95 kg) in his early twenties. Grace was a non-smoker, but he enjoyed good food and wine.

Grace in 1871 was principally involved with four teams: the Gentlemen, Gloucestershire County Cricket Club, Marylebone Cricket Club (MCC) and the United South of England Eleven (USEE). Gloucestershire was then a new club, generally understood to have been formally constituted in 1870 and had played its first two first-class matches that season. Grace had joined MCC in 1869. The USEE had been founded in 1865 and Grace had played for it occasionally but he formally joined the club in 1870 as its match organiser, for which he received payment, though he played for expenses only.

1871 was a wet summer and, even when the rain relented, there was a persistent chilly wind. Grace, however, had the skill and resilience to cope with adverse conditions and some of his best batting performances were achieved on wet wickets.

May: the season begins
Grace began the season on 8 May playing for MCC against a Colts XV at Lord's. He took 7/56 in the Colts' first innings and then scored 44 and 31, but the Colts won by 34 runs.

In the opening first-class fixture, Grace played a brilliant innings of 181 for MCC against Surrey at Lord's, enabling MCC to win by an innings and 23 runs. A week later, playing for MCC against Yorkshire, also at Lord's, his second innings of 98 (run out) in a low scoring game effectively decided the match which MCC won by 55 runs. After scoring another century (118) in an all-amateurs match, he played for South v North at Lord's and scored 178, enabling his team to win by an innings and 49 runs.

June
On 1 June, Grace scored his fourth century in five matches with 162 for the Gentlemen against Cambridge University, following up with bowling figures of 7/103 in the University's second innings. In his next match, he made his first appearance of the season for Gloucestershire, this time playing against MCC and, though he made relatively modest scores of 49 and 34 not out, he still finished on the winning side, by 5 wickets. Apart from an innings of 88 for MCC against Middlesex, Grace had low scores in the rest of June and no great success as a bowler either.

Gloucestershire defeated Surrey at The Oval by an innings and 60 runs, a significant victory for the new county club against one of the established counties. Surrey batted first and were bowled out for 161, largely due to George Strachan who took 5/45. Grace opened the Gloucestershire first innings with his brother E. M. but both were dismissed cheaply and Gloucestershire had to recover from a position of 7–2 to make 315, half-centuries being scored by Charles Gordon, Fred Grace and Robert Miles. James Street took 7/141 for Surrey. Batting again, Surrey needed 154 to avoid the innings defeat but were bowled out for 94 by E. M. and W. G. Grace who took all ten wickets between them, brother Fred helping the cause by holding three catches.

Following successive matches for MCC at Lord's against Cambridge University and Oxford University, Grace travelled up to Grantham with the United South of England Eleven (USEE), his first engagement with them in 1871. It was a match scheduled for three days with the USEE playing 11 against 22 and winning by five wickets. Grace did not bowl, leaving that to James Lillywhite, James Southerton and Ned Willsher. He scored 13 and 56 not out including the winning hit.

Grace travelled back to London from Grantham to play at The Oval for Gentlemen of the South against Players of the South. Although it was a relatively high-scoring match, he could only make 4 and 11, his team losing by just 3 runs. Players struggled on the first day and were dismissed for 173, Grace taking 3/50, the innings bolstered by Henry Charlwood's 77. Gentlemen reached 187–6 by the close and finished at 323 on the second day. 150 behind, Players now began a recovery and amassed 278–4 at close of play with Ted Pooley 93 not out after Harry Jupp had been dismissed for 97. Pooley went on to 125 on the final morning and Players were eventually dismissed for 398 (Grace 1/32). Needing 248, Gentlemen were dismissed for 245 having reached 239–7, Southerton taking 6/95.

July
The first two Gentlemen v Players matches of 1871 were held in early July at Lord's, starting Monday, 3 July, and the Oval, starting on Thursday, 6 July. The Lord's fixture was drawn as a result of rain. Gentlemen won the toss and batted first, scoring 208. Grace, who opened with A. N. Hornby, scored 50. Players responded with 180, Grace taking 1/16, and Gentlemen then scored 146 all out, Grace making 37. There was no time left for the second Players innings to begin. At the Oval, there was better weather and the match was completed, Gentlemen winning by 5 wickets. They batted first and totalled 299. Grace made only 16 and the outstanding innings was 97 by Walter Hadow. Players struggled and only the efforts of Robert Carpenter, who was 72 not out, enabled them to reach 182. Following on, Players were better in the second innings and scored 260 to leave Gentlemen needing 144 to win. Grace scored 43 as they easily reached 145–5.

Then Grace cut loose again with an outstanding innings of 189 not out (carrying his bat) in a Married v Single game at Lord's, his Single team winning by an innings and 73 runs. This innings was played on a "sticky wicket" after rain and many people considered it the finest of Grace's career, though Grace himself disagreed. In his Reminiscences, he modestly says he "played for the Single side and made 189 (not out)". The match was a benefit for Ned Willsher and the second day was rained off so Grace helped to arrange another match for Willsher, played at Mote Park, Maidstone in September. Grace began the innings cautiously and took fifteen minutes to score his first run but then, records Rae, he "scored at a cracking pace". MCC Secretary Harry Perkins had no doubts and insisted that it was Grace's greatest-ever performance with rain frequently stopping play and making the wicket at times "unplayable".

When MCC played Kent at Lord's, Grace scored 51 out of 183 as MCC won easily by an innings and 9 runs within two days. He scored 146 21 for MCC against Surrey at the Oval, but his team lost by just one wicket despite having had to follow on. Grace took 4/48 in the Surrey second innings as they struggled to reach their target of 111. MCC then played Sussex at Lord's, winning a low-scoring game by 8 wickets in only two days. Grace batted once and scored 59, the only half-century in the match.

Grace produced his season highlight in another South v North match, played at the Oval, when he made his highest career score to date of 268, having been dismissed by Jem Shaw for nought in the first innings. It was to no avail as the match was drawn. The occasion produced a memorable and oft-quoted comment by Jem Shaw who ruefully said: "I puts the ball where I likes and he puts it where he likes". The match was a benefit for H. H. Stephenson.

During July, Grace made two appearances for the USEE at Uppingham and Broughton, both being "odds" matches with 11 against 22. At Uppingham, Grace scored only one run but took 25 wickets. The match was drawn. At Broughton, the match was ruined by rain and Grace made 18 in his sole innings.

August
Beginning on 3 August, Grace captained Gloucestershire against Nottinghamshire at the Clifton College Close Ground in Bristol. He scored 78 and 55 against an attack consisting mostly of Alfred Shaw and Jem Shaw. The match was drawn. Next came a North v South match at St Lawrence Ground in Canterbury which the South won by 100 runs, Grace scoring 31 and 40 including the 2,000th run of his first-class season so far.

After another century for the MCC Gentlemen against Kent, he played for Gentlemen v Players at the Royal Brunswick Ground, Brighton, in August and, for the second time, followed a first innings "duck" with a double century. As on the previous occasion, the feat was achieved in a benefit match, this time for John Lillywhite. In the second innings, Grace and his brother Fred shared a second wicket partnership of 241 till Fred was out for 98, W.G. going on to score 217.

Beginning on 17 August, Grace captained Gloucestershire against Surrey at Clifton College Close and was for once overshadowed by a teammate as he scored only 23 while Thomas Matthews compiled 201. Gloucestershire totalled exactly 400 and won the match by an innings and 9 runs. Grace took four wickets in Surrey's first innings.

When Gloucestershire went to Trent Bridge to play Nottinghamshire, Grace scored 79 and 116 but his team lost by 10 wickets after Jem Shaw took 13 wickets in the match. It was the first time that anyone had scored a century on the ground and Grace's presence ensured a bumper crowd with over £400 being taken at the gate. This money went a long way towards the £1500 that Nottinghamshire needed to erect the Trent Bridge Pavilion.

September
Grace played 4 matches in September including three for the USEE in Birmingham, Chichester and Chesterfield. His final first-class match of the season was at Mote Park, Maidstone where his own select team played Kent in a benefit match for Ned Willsher. The match was drawn; Grace scored 81 not out and 42 not out and took ten wickets in the match with 6–67 and 4–83.

Gloucestershire
Gloucestershire played four county matches in 1871. They twice defeated Surrey by an innings margin but had less success against Nottinghamshire, drawing with them at Clifton College Close Ground and then losing by 10 wickets at Trent Bridge. The team had certain regulars but tended to include occasional and even guest players, some of whom weakened the side, whereas Nottinghamshire generally turned out a full-strength eleven. The key Gloucestershire players were the three Graces, batsman Thomas Matthews, wicket-keeper James Bush (who was also an England rugby union international), slow left-armer Robert Miles and all-rounders George Strachan and Frank Townsend. Newcomers in 1871 were Frederic Carter and George Wyatt who both made a number of appearances over the next few seasons.

Season summary
In all first-class matches in 1871, a total of 17 centuries were scored and Grace accounted for 10 of them, including the first century in a first-class match at Trent Bridge. He averaged 78.25 and the next best average by a batsman playing more than a single innings was 39.57, barely more than half his figure. His aggregate for the season was 2,739 and this was the first time that anyone had scored 2,000 first-class runs in a season; Harry Jupp was next best with 1,068. Grace's highest score was 268 for South v. North at The Oval. He took 79 wickets at 17.02 with a best analysis of 7–67. He claimed five wickets in an innings 5 times and twice had 10 in a match. Besides Grace and apart from Jupp and Ted Pooley who were the highest runscorers, other leading batsmen in 1871 were Richard Daft, Robert Carpenter, Fred Grace, Henry Charlwood and Ephraim Lockwood. The leading bowlers were James Southerton, Alfred Shaw, Jem Shaw, Frank Farrands, Grace, Ned Willsher, James Street and Tom Emmett.

Aftermath
According to Harry Altham, 1871 was Grace's annus mirabilis, except that he produced another outstanding year in 1895. Grace summarised it as "one of my best seasons" as he scored 10 centuries. He later told Bernard Darwin that he had needed to apply great patience when batting in 1871 because of the generally wet weather which produced poor wickets and difficult batting conditions. Simon Rae remarked that cricket enthusiasts still argue about Grace's "greatest season" and that 1871 features in any such discussion.

Grace had numerous nicknames during his career including "The Doctor", after he achieved his medical qualification; "The Old Man", as he reached the veteran stage; and most auspiciously "The Champion". He was first acclaimed as "the Champion Cricketer" by John Lillywhite's Cricketer's Companion (aka "Green Lilly") in recognition of his exploits in 1871.

But Grace's great year was marred by the death of his father in December. Grace and his younger brother Fred still lived with their mother at the family home in Downend and they had to increase their involvement with the USEE to pay for their medical studies.

References

Bibliography

External links
 CricketArchive – W. G. Grace

1871 in English cricket
English cricket seasons in the 19th century
1871